Donald Jude Morley (7 October 1930 – 23 June 2006) was a British race car driver from Suffolk who specialized in rally driving.

Career
He won twice the Coupe des Alpes (Alpine Rally) in France, in 1961 and 1962, driving an Austin-Healey 3000, and was co-driven by Earle Morley, his identical twin brother. In doing so, he became the first British driver to win the race in more than 10 years. Donald also came onto the podium in the RAC Rally in 1960.

In 1966 he married Valerie Domleo, also a rally driver who co-drove for popular female drivers of the decade such as Pauline Mayman and Rosemary Smith.

In his later years after retiring from rallying, Donald and his family became farmers in Stowmarket.

Rally results

External links
 eWRC

English rally drivers
1930 births
2006 deaths